Melaleuca torquata is a plant in the myrtle family, Myrtaceae and is endemic to the south of Western Australia. It is a prickly shrub whose leaves have a distinct mid-vein on the lower surface and which has heads of pinkish white flowerheads in early spring.

Description
The end of the leaf tapers to a very fine point making the shrub very prickly.

The stamens of the flowers are white but the petals are pink or red. The flowers are arranged in heads or short spikes on the ends of branches which continue to grow after flowering and sometimes also in the upper leaf axils. The stamens are arranged in five bundles around the flowers and there are 3 to 13 stamens per bundle.

Taxonomy and naming
Melaleuca torquata was first formally described in 1988 by Bryan Barlow in Australian Systematic Botany. The specific epithet (torquata) is from the Latin words torquatus meaning "adorned with a neck chain or collar" in reference to the top of the fruits which looks like a crown.

Distribution and habitat
Melaleuca torquata occurs in and between the Katanning, Stirling Range and Cape Arid districts in the Avon Wheatbelt, Esperance Plains, Jarrah Forest and Mallee biogeographic regions. It grows in clayey or sandy loam on undulating plains and in winter-wet depressions.

Conservation
Melaleuca torquata is listed as "not threatened" by the Government of Western Australia Department of Parks and Wildlife.

References

torquata
Myrtales of Australia
Plants described in 1988
Endemic flora of Western Australia